Viliami Tapaatoutai (born 21 October 1972) is a Tongan weightlifter. He competed in the men's middle heavyweight event at the 1996 Summer Olympics.

References

External links
 

1972 births
Living people
Tongan male weightlifters
Olympic weightlifters of Tonga
Weightlifters at the 1996 Summer Olympics
Place of birth missing (living people)